is a variation of origami, the Japanese art of folding paper. In , the paper is cut as well as being folded, resulting in a three-dimensional design that stands away from the page.  typically does not use glue.

Overview
The book achieved enough success that the word  was accepted as the Western name for the art of paper cutting.

Typically,  starts with a folded base, which is then unfolded; cuts are then opened and flattened to make the finished design. Simple  are usually symmetrical, such as snowflakes, pentagrams, or orchid blossoms.

Notable  artists 
  (born 1924–), a renowned  artist known for his colourful , which have also been published as a book.
 Nahoko Kojima (born 1981–), a professional contemporary Japanese  artist, who pioneered sculptural, three-dimensional .

See also
 History of origami
 Origamic architecture
 Paper cutting
 Paper model

References

External links

The site of Kirigami in Russian and in English
Kirigami model of Durban stadium
Kirigami of Italian monuments
gallery from Italy
Examples of small kirigami projects that are easy to make at home

Origami
Paper art
Japanese words and phrases